Sladký (feminine form Sladká ) is a Czech and Slovak surname. It is derived from the Czech–Slovak word sladký for "sweet", originally a nickname for a "pleasant", "agreeable" person.
People with the surname include:
 Alexandra Sladky Anderson (born 1955), American quilter, television series host and author
 Jan Sladký Kozina (1652–1695), Czech revolutionary leader 
 Jim Sladky (1947–2017), American ice dancer
 Judy Sladky (born 1950), American actress and former competitive ice dancer
 Martin Sladký (born 1992), Czech footballer
 Tomáš Sladký (born 1986), Czech floorball player
 Václav Sladký (1879–1940), Czech politician and high school educator

See also
 
 Slatko

References

Czech-language surnames
Slovak-language surnames
Surnames from nicknames